Laurent Chardard (born 30 August 1995) is a French Paralympic swimmer who competes in international elite events. He is a European gold medalist and a World gold medalist.

Personal life
Chardard lost his right arm and leg from a shark attack while bodyboarding at a beach near his hometown.

References

External links
 
 

1995 births
Living people
Sportspeople from Réunion
Paralympic swimmers of France
Medalists at the World Para Swimming Championships
Medalists at the World Para Swimming European Championships
Shark attack victims
S6-classified Paralympic swimmers
Swimmers at the 2020 Summer Paralympics